Chatton is a surname. Notable people with the surname include:

Édouard Chatton (1883–1947), French biologist
Charlotte Chatton (born 1975), English actress
Walter Chatton (1290–1343), English theologian and philosopher
Harry Chatton (born 1899), Irish footballer